Acianthus saxatilis is a species of flowering plant in the orchid family Orchidaceae and is endemic to Queensland. It is a terrestrial herb with a single, relatively large, heart-shaped leaf and usually up to 5 translucent greenish-brown to greenish-yellow flowers.

Description
Acianthus saxatilis is a glabrous, terrestrial, tuberous herb that grows in small colonies. The leaf is pale green on the upper surface and reddish-green to greenish-purple on the lower side. Flowering occurs from February to May.

This species is distinguished from others in the genus by its relatively large leaf, large floral bracts and greenish and brown flowers

Taxonomy and naming
Acianthus saxatilis was first formally described in 2014 by David L. Jones and Mark Alwin Clements from specimens collected near Lightning Falls in Lamington National Park in 2010 and the description was published in Australian Orchid Review. The specific epithet (saxatilis) means "dwelling amongst rocks".

Distribution
This orchid is only known from two populations in the Border Ranges of south-eastern Queensland.

Conservation
Acianthus saxatilis is listed as "endangered" under the Queensland Government Nature Conservation Act 1992.

References 

fornicatus
Orchids of New South Wales
Orchids of Queensland
Endemic orchids of Australia
Plants described in 1810
Taxa named by Robert Brown (botanist, born 1773)